Forsyth Park (formerly known as the Military Parade Ground) is a large city park that occupies  in the historic district of Savannah, Georgia, United States. The park is bordered by Gaston Street to the north, Drayton Street to the east, Park Avenue to the south and Whitaker Street to the west. It contains walking paths, a children's play area, a Fragrant Garden for the blind, a large fountain, tennis courts, basketball courts, areas for soccer and Frisbee, and home field for Savannah Shamrocks Rugby Club. From time to time, there are concerts held at Forsyth to the benefit of the public.

Development
In 1851, the park was expanded and named for Georgia Governor John Forsyth. By 1853, all original planned wards of Savannah were occupied. A large 18.9 acre Parade Ground was added south end of the park and sold to the Military Captains Association officially in 1859. Two ordinances, one in 1914 and the other in 1923, affirm this. The owners granted that the city use the land for public enjoyment, in exchange for property tax exemption and general maintenance and security of the land in perpetuity.

Regarding the Southern Extension Chain of Ownership:

On August 11, 1853, the Mayor and Aldermen of Savannah adopted an ordinance dedicating as a Military Parade Ground that portion of the 'Old Cantonment Area' with borders of Park, Montgomery, Gwinnett, Whitaker "that the control, custody, and management of the said Parade Ground shall be vested in the Captains for the time being, of the several Volunteer Companies of the City of Savannah, who shall have exclusive charge thereof, subject to Savannah police regulations.

On November 10, 1859 by an Act of Council of the City of Savannah, following an agreement with the Military Commanders, that property, the Military Parade Ground, formerly a part of the Old Cantonment, was exchanged for the trace of land, 18.9 acres known as the (southern Forsyth) Park Extension. The Committee on Sales and Public Lots was given power to set with regard to the land obtained for the Military and in their reports to Council they recited that the City had profited by the exchange and from the sale of the subdivided lots to the extent of many thousands of dollars and that the Military of Savannah now possessed a "handsome, permanent, and attractive Parade Ground wherein Company and Regimental drills may at all times be had, the reference being to the present Parade Ground, Forsyth Park Extension." Under date of July 22, 1914 there was a clarifying ordinance passed by City Council in connection with the fact that portions of the Park Extension were being used as playgrounds. This Act states that such use "shall not be a relinquishment of any right which the Military Companies of Savannah may have in said Parade Ground, or in the use thereof, the right sof the Volunteer Companies being hereby confirmed and preserved."

Finally, there was "an Ordinance passed by the Mayor and Aldermen, in Council assembled, July 11, 1923, and on file in the office of the Clerk of Council" which reads in part as follows: "NOW THEREFORE, in view of the fact that the City of Savannah made the exchange mentioned and has received the benefits, and yet has failed to make any formal transfer, it is hereby ordained by the Mayor and Aldermen of the City of Savannah in Council assembled, that the title and right of the Military companies of Savannah through their Commanding Officers, in the ground known as the Parade Ground or Forsyth Park Exension, the same being bounded on the north by Forsyth Park proper, on the east by Drayton Street, on the south by Park Avenue and on the west by Whitaker Street, as a Military Parade Ground, are fully recognized and confirmed as fully and as completely as if a deed of exchange had been made. Be it furth ordained that all ordinances and parts of ordinances in conflict with this ordinance be and the same are hereby repealed."

The Civil War Memorial

Built in 1874, Forsyth Park hosts a large monument to Confederate dead. One of the first and largest in the state, the monument was unveiled in 1874, with the bronze statue of a Confederate soldier added several years later in 1879.

Spanish-American War Memorial 
Standing at the south end of Forsyth Park, The Hiker is a statue created by Theo Alice Ruggles Kitson. It commemorates the American soldiers who fought in the Spanish–American War, the Boxer Rebellion and the Philippine-American War. The first version of it was made for the University of Minnesota in 1906,  The Hiker depicts a hero stripped of his parade uniform and shown as a soldier reacting to the challenges of the battlefield.   Officially called "The Georgia Volunteer," it was erected in Savannah because that city contributed more Spanish–American War soldiers per capita than any other city in Georgia.

Bonaventure Cemetery just outside of Savannah on a bluff of the Wilmington River has a section dedicated to the Spanish-American War Veterans from Worth Bagley Camp.  It is the nation's second-largest area dedicated to those killed in the Spanish-American War.

Fountain 
As one of the most photographed fountains in Savannah, the Forsyth Park Fountain sits on a direct line of continuation along the Bull Street corridor. The fountain was manufactured by Janes, Beebe & Company in Bronx County, New York — an iron foundry owned by Adrian Janes, which also created iron work for the Capitol dome of the U.S. Capitol Building and railings for the Brooklyn Bridge.

The fountain was installed in 1858. Its design by John Howard is derived from the work of the French sculptor, Michel Lienard, and is reminiscent of the fountains at Place de la Concorde in Paris. Other examples of this fountain can be found in Poughkeepsie, New York; Madison, Indiana; and Cuzco, Peru.

At the time of installation, Parisian urban planning was centered on the development of residential neighborhoods radiating out from a central green space. The Parisian model of developing large city parks was emulated by cities in the United States, including Savannah.

Every St. Patrick's Day, the fountain is ceremoniously turned green in celebration of Savannah's deep Irish heritage.

The fountain appears in many films, including The Longest Yard, Cape Fear, Forrest Gump and Midnight in the Garden of Good and Evil.

Surrounding buildings
The below buildings each occupy one of the ten blocks on the three sides of the northern half park and are noted as historic structures by the Historic Preservation Department of the Chatham County-Savannah Metropolitan Planning Commission. These blocks fall in one of four wards. Clockwise from the north, these are Monterey Ward, Calhoun Ward, Forsyth Ward and Chatham Ward. The properties are listed, again clockwise from the north, from the first East Gaston Street block.

John Berendt, author of 1994's Midnight in the Garden of Good and Evil, lived in Forsyth Park Apartments in the southwestern corner of the park while writing the book.

References

External links
 Forsyth Park historical marker

Urban public parks
Parks in Savannah, Georgia